Roxane Mesquida (born 1 October 1981) is a French-American actress and model based in Los Angeles.

Mesquida grew up in Le Pradet, a little town located in southern France. Her mother, writer Françoise Mesquida, is French/Spanish and her father is Italian/American, but Mesquida never got to know him. Mesquida is fluent in English and French, and she speaks Spanish, Italian and German.

Acting career
She was discovered at the age of 11, while walking on a road with her mom, by French director Manuel Pradal who was in the middle of the casting process for his movie Marie from the Bay of Angels (Marie Baie des Anges) at the time. She took part in the shooting during the summer after their encounter.

In 1998, she also played opposite Isabelle Huppert in The School of Flesh (L'École de la Chair) by Benoît Jacquot.  A few years later, she crossed paths with the renowned director who would make her well-known and, according to Roxane, who made her learn her craft: Catherine Breillat. First they collaborated in Fat Girl (À ma sœur !), then in Sex Is Comedy, and they worked together again in 2006's The Last Mistress, with Asia Argento.

In 2006, Mesquida played alongside Vincent Cassel in Sheitan, by Kim Chapiron, after which she decided to move to the United States. She spent several months in New York, where she attended The Barrow Group with Anne Hathaway, then settled in Los Angeles.

Mesquida then appeared in Kaboom by independent filmmaker Gregg Araki, as well as in Rubber by Quentin "Mr. Oizo" Dupieux. She also starred in Buck 65's music video "Paper Airplane", and in Gruff Rhys's, "Shark Ridden Waters".

From 2011 to 2012, Mesquida played Béatrice, the sister of Louis Grimaldi (Hugo Becker) in the fifth season of the American teen drama television series Gossip Girl. She also starred in the New Zealand film The Most Fun You Can Have Dying by Kirstin Marcon, as well as Kiss of the Damned by Alexandra Cassavetes (the daughter of John Cassavetes), and Homesick by young independent filmmaker Frédéric Da. In 2012, she was cast in the Canadian action television series XIII: The Series, and appeared in Marilyn Manson's music video for "No Reflection".

Modeling
Mesquida was spotted by Elite Model Management when she was 14 and she has been working as a model since then. She currently is signed by worldwide modeling agency IMG Models.

Mesquida has worked with  photographers  Karl Lagerfeld, Ellen von Unwerth for Russian Vogue, Corinne Day for French Vogue, she did the cover of Italian Vogue photographed by Paolo Roversi, the cover of French Playboy photographed by François Rotger, as well as the covers of British Asos, Crash magazine, Citizen K, Express Style, among many others. She appeared in magazines, such as Teen Vogue, Vanity Fair, Harper's Bazaar, Self Service, Rolling Stone, Italia, L'Uomo Vogue, Jalouse, L'Officiel, Above, Velvet, and No.

She appears in an art video for Opening Ceremony. She is the muse of shoe designer Jerome C. Rousseau.

Style
Mesquida's style has been praised by the American edition of Vogue.

Personal life
Following her collaboration with Mr. Oizo and Justice's Gaspard Augé in Rubber, Mesquida started DJing with American rapper MDNA in fashion events.

She lives in Charlie Chaplin's former house in West Hollywood.

She married musician and filmmaker Frederic Da in February 2011. They have a daughter, Lilya.

Filmography

Film

Television

References

External links

 

1981 births
20th-century French actresses
21st-century French actresses
20th-century American actresses
21st-century American actresses
Actresses from Marseille
American film actresses
American television actresses
French emigrants to the United States
French female models
French film actresses
Female models from California
French people of American descent
French people of Italian descent
French people of Spanish descent
French television actresses
Living people
IMG Models models